Golden Cross is a 2014 South Korean television series starring Kim Kang-woo, Lee Si-young, Um Ki-joon, Han Eun-jung, and Jeong Bo-seok. It aired on KBS2 from April 9 to June 19, 2014 on Wednesdays and Thursdays at 22:00 for 20 episodes.

Plot
A shadowy society known as "Golden Cross" dominates the Korean economy and marketplace with its deep connections and financial power. Prosecutor Kang Do-yoon gets entangled in their dealings when one of their plots gets his beloved sister murdered, a crime for which his father then gets framed. Do-yoon vows revenge on Seo Dong-ha, the powerful man behind the organization, but complications arise when he learns that Seo is the father of the woman he loves, his colleague Seo Yi-re. Yi-re is a righteous and truth-seeking prosecutor; she grew up respecting and obeying her father, and her life is thrown into disarray when she discovers his dark side. Meanwhile, Seo nurtures a protegee, businessman Michael Jang, whose greed and ambition soon makes him challenge his mentor for the top spot. A clash of wills, fortunes, and egos commences.

Cast

Main characters
Kim Kang-woo as Kang Do-yoon
Lee Si-young as Seo Yi-re
Um Ki-joon as Michael Jang
Han Eun-jung as Hong Sa-ra
Jeong Bo-seok as Seo Dong-ha

Supporting characters
Lee Dae-yeon as Kang Joo-wan
Jung Ae-ri as Oh Geum-shil
Jo Hee-bong as Kang Joo-dong
Park Byung-eun as Gil Sang-joon
Choi Woo-seok as Bong Chang-soo
Lee Joo-seung as Oh Chang-hee
Kim Min-ji as Kang Ha-yoon
Lee Ho-jae as Kim Jae-gab
Lee Ah-hyun as Kim Se-ryung
Ban Min-jung as Song Jung-soo
Kim Kyu-chul as Park Hee-seo
Jo Deok-hyun as Kwak Dae-soo
Park Won-sang as Im Kyung-jae
Jo Jae-ryong as Jool-ja
Kim Jung-heon as Alex
Jung Won-joong as Kwon Se-il
Gi Ju-bong as Jung Gyu-jik
Julien Kang as Evan

Ratings

Awards and nominations

Production
Park Si-hoo was originally considered for the role of Michael Jang, but continuing public outrage regarding his sexual assault case in 2013 led broadcaster KBS to cancel his casting.

References

External links
  
 
 
 

2014 South Korean television series debuts
2014 South Korean television series endings
Korean Broadcasting System television dramas
Korean-language television shows
Television series about prosecutors
South Korean thriller television series
Television series by Pan Entertainment